The Red Lake greenstone belt is an Archean greenstone belt at the town of Red Lake in Northwestern Ontario, Canada. It consists of basaltic and komatiitic volcanics ranging in age from 2,925 to 2,940 million years old and younger rhyolite-andesite volcanics ranging in age from 2,730 to 2,750 million years old.

See also
Volcanism in Canada
List of greenstone belts

References

Greenstone belts
Volcanism of Ontario
Mesoarchean volcanism
Neoarchean volcanism
Precambrian Canada
Red Lake, Ontario